The 1945–46 Norwegian Ice Hockey Championship season was the seventh season of ice hockey in Norway, first since 1940. Sportsklubben Forward won the championship.

Results
There were four groups played, one in Trondheim, and three in Oslo. The winners from the group rounds qualified for the semifinals, and the semifinal winners qualified for the final.

Final
 Sportsklubben Forward - Sportsklubben Strong 3:1

External links 
 Norwegian Ice Hockey Federation

Nor
GET-ligaen seasons
1945–46 in Norwegian ice hockey